Fort Jones may mean:

Fort Jones, the U. S. Army outpost in Siskiyou County, California
Fort Jones, California, a town 1 mile north of the site of the old Fort Jones, in Siskiyou County.